John Hickes (fl. 1380–1388), of Oxford, was an English politician and spicer.

He was a Member (MP) of the Parliament of England for Oxford in January 1380, October 1383, April 1384, November 1384 and February 1388.

References

14th-century births
Year of death missing
English MPs January 1380
People from Oxford
English MPs October 1383
English MPs April 1384
English MPs November 1384
English MPs February 1388